Nandini Nagar Mahavidyalaya (NNM) is located at  Nawabganj, in Gonda district of Uttar Pradesh. The college is affiliated to Dr. Ram Manohar Lohia Awadh University, Faizabad and approved by Pharmacy Council of India for providing diploma in pharmacy.

Programmes
The college offers undergraduate course under the aegis of Ram Manohar Lohia Awadh University in - 
 Bachelor of Science (B.Sc.) in Pharmacy
 Bachelor of Arts (B.A)
 Bachelor of Commerce (B.Com)
 Bachelor of Education (B.Ed)

References

External links

Universities and colleges in Uttar Pradesh
Colleges of Dr. Ram Manohar Lohia Awadh University
Gonda district